Coracoid tuberosity may refer to:
 coracoid process of the scapula
 conoid tubercle of the clavicle